, unofficially designated ,  and , is a binary trans-Neptunian object in the classical Kuiper belt, the outermost region of the Solar System. It was first observed by the New Horizons KBO Search using the Hubble Space Telescope on 30 July 2014. Until 2015, when the object 486958 Arrokoth was selected, it was a potential flyby target for the New Horizons probe.

Discovery and designation 

 was discovered by the New Horizons Search Team with the help of the Hubble Space Telescope because the object has a magnitude of 26.3, which is too faint to be observed by ground-based telescopes. Preliminary observations by the HST searching for KBO flyby targets for the New Horizons probe started in June 2014, and more intensive observations continued in July and August.  was first discovered in observations on July 30, 2014, but it was designated e31007AI at the time, nicknamed e3 for short. Its existence as a potential target of the New Horizons probe was revealed by NASA in October 2014 and designated PT2, but the official name  was not assigned by the Minor Planet Center until March 2015 after better orbit information was available.

Orbit and classification 
 is a trans-Neptunian object and likely a non-resonant classical Kuiper belt object, also known as "cubewano". It orbits the Sun at a distance of 42.5–45.4 AU once every 291 years and 3 months (106,394 days; semi-major axis of 43.94 AU). Its orbit has an eccentricity of 0.03 and an inclination of 4° with respect to the ecliptic. As this object has not been observed since October 2014, its orbit remains poorly determined still containing a high uncertainty.

The body's observation arc begins with a precovery taken on 25 June 2014, by the New Horizons KBO Search team using the Subaru Telescope at Mauna Kea Observatory on Hawaii.

Binary 
After the New Horizons probe completed its flyby of Arrokoth, the probe began observations of other nearby surrounding Kuiper belt objects, including . Observations of 's brightness variations at high phase angles allowed the New Horizons probe to make a rough determination of its rotation period as well as its shape. As New Horizons observed  at phase angles near 90°, it displayed large variations in brightness, indicating that its shape is either extremely elongated or  could be a binary system of two separated components.  appeared to be possibly a separated binary in a few resolved New Horizons images, but in 2020 this remained inconclusive.

Exploration 

After the New Horizons probe completed its flyby of Pluto, the probe was to be maneuvered to a flyby of at least one Kuiper belt object. Several potential targets were under consideration for the first such flyby.  has an estimated mean-diameter between 30 and 55 kilometers, depending on the body's assumed albedo. The potential encounter in 2018–2019 would have been at a distance of 43–44 AU from the Sun.

The spacecraft passed  in January 2019, at a distance of less than 0.1 AU (15 million km, 9.3 million miles). This makes  the second closest KBO observed by New Horizons, after Arrokoth.

Numbering and naming 
This minor planet has not been numbered by the Minor Planet Center and remains unnamed.

See also 
 , another tight binary KBO observed by New Horizons
 List of New Horizons topics

References

External links 
 List of Transneptunian Objects, Minor Planet Center
 

Minor planet object articles (unnumbered)

Discoveries using the Hubble Space Telescope
New Horizons

20140730